The following is the final results of the Iran Super League 2006/07 basketball season.

Regular season

Group A

Group B

Playoffs

Championship

1st round

Quarterfinals

Semifinals

3rd place match

Final

Classifications

5th-8th places

5th-8th

5th place match

9th-14th places

9th-14th

9th-12th

11th place match

9th place match

Final ranking

 Saba Battery and Petrochimi qualified to WABA Champions Cup 2008.
 TB Kerman and Pegah Shiraz relegated to Division 1.

References
 Final results
 Final ranking
 Asia-Basket

Iranian Basketball Super League seasons
League
Iran